Kondapura Lakkappa (23 December 1929 - 8 November 1991) is an Indian politician who was the Member of Parliament in the Lok Sabha, from the Tumkur in 1967 as a Praja Socialist Party candidate. In 1970, he joined the Indian National Congress and was re-elected as its candidate in 1971, 1977, and 1980 from the same constituency in Karnataka.

Early life and background 
K. Lakkappa was born on 23 December 1929 in Kondapura, Tumkur District. Shri Thope Gowda was his father. He completed his education in B.A. and B.L. from Mysore University.

Personal life 
K. Lakkappa married Smt B G Puttamma and the couple has four sons and two daughters.

Political career 
K. Lakkappa was associated with Praja Socialist Party and served as a Member of Mysore State Executive of Praja Socialist Party. 

Later in 1970, He joined Indian National Congress and became a member of K.P.P.C. (Karnataka Pradesh Congress Committee) and A.I.C.C. (All India Congress Committee).

Lakkappa founded many educational instructions in the rural areas of Tumkur District. He also founded the Association of unemployed educated youth in Karnataka. He worked for the uplifting of poor farmers (Kisan), labours and youth living in rural areas of the country.

Position held 

 Served as a Member of several Government committees at the Centre, Cardamom Board and Spices Development Board.
 Appointed as a Member of the Catering Committee in Indian Airlines by the Government of India.

References

External links
Official biographical sketch in Parliament of India website

1929 births
Living people
India MPs 1967–1970
India MPs 1971–1977
India MPs 1977–1979
India MPs 1980–1984
Praja Socialist Party politicians
Lok Sabha members from Karnataka
People from Tumkur district
Indian National Congress politicians from Karnataka